This article lists the winners and nominees for the Black Reel Award for Best Supporting Actress in a Motion Picture. Academy Award-nominated or winning performances also honored with nominations or wins at the Black Reel Awards include Lupita Nyong'o (12 Years a Slave), Queen Latifah (Chicago), Jennifer Hudson (Dreamgirls), Penélope Cruz (Vicky Cristina Barcelona), Taraji P. Henson (The Curious Case of Benjamin Button), Viola Davis (Doubt), Mo'Nique (Precious), and Octavia Spencer  (The Help).

Winners and nominees
Winners are listed first and highlighted in bold.

† indicates an Academy Award–winning performance.
‡ indicates an Academy Award–nominated performance that same year.

2000s

2010s

2020s

Multiple nominations and wins

Multiple nominations

 6 Nominations
 Octavia Spencer

 5 Nominations
 Angela Bassett
 Viola Davis

 4 Nominations
 Kerry Washington

 3 nominations
 Janelle Monae
 Gabrielle Union

 2 Nominations
 Joy Bryant
 Rosario Dawson
 Shareeka Epps
 Naomie Harris
 Taraji P. Henson
 Regina King
 Queen Latifah
 Nia Long
 Zoe Saldana

References

Black Reel Awards
Film awards for supporting actress